Naoko Masuda is a former taijiquan athlete from Japan. She won a silver medal at the 1991 World Wushu Championships and two years later, she became first Japanese female athlete to become a world champion in taijiquan at the 1993 World Wushu Championships. She also won the silver medal in women's taijiquan at the 1994 Asian Games.

See also 

 List of Asian Games medalists in wushu

References 

Japanese wushu practitioners
Wushu practitioners at the 1994 Asian Games
Asian Games silver medalists for Japan
Asian Games medalists in wushu
Medalists at the 1994 Asian Games